Lubomirskia is a genus of sponges belonging to the family Lubomirskiidae.

The species of this genus are found in Baikal Lake.

Species:

Lubomirskia abietina 
Lubomirskia baikalensis 
Lubomirskia fusifera 
Lubomirskia incrustans

References

Heteroscleromorpha
Sponge genera